Metamagical Themas is an eclectic collection of articles that Douglas Hofstadter wrote for the popular science magazine Scientific American during the early 1980s. The anthology was published in 1985 by Basic Books.

The volume is substantial in size and contains extensive notes concerning responses to the articles and other information relevant to their content.  (One of the notes—page 65—suggested memetics for the study of memes.)

Major themes include: self-reference in memes, language, art and logic; discussions of philosophical issues important in cognitive science/AI; analogies and what makes something similar to something else (specifically what makes, for example, an uppercase letter 'A' recognizable as such); and lengthy discussions of the work of Robert Axelrod on the prisoner's dilemma, as well as the idea of superrationality.

The concept of superrationality, and its relevance to the Cold War, environmental issues and such, is accompanied by notes on experiments conducted by the author at the time. Another notable feature is the inclusion of two dialogues in the style of those appearing in Gödel, Escher, Bach. Ambigrams are mentioned.

There are three articles centered on the Lisp programming language, in which Hofstadter first details the language itself, and then shows how it relates to Gödel's incompleteness theorem. Two articles are devoted to Rubik's Cube and similar puzzles. Many chapters open with an illustration of an extremely abstract alphabet, yet one which is still gestaltly recognizable as such.

The game of Nomic was first introduced to the public in this column, in June 1982, when excerpts from a book (still unpublished at the time) by the game's creator Peter Suber were printed and discussed.

The index of the book mentions Hofstadter's recurring alter ego, Egbert B. Gebstadter.

List of Hofstadter's "Metamagical Themas" columns
From January 1957 through December 1980, Martin Gardner's "Mathematical Games" column was a monthly feature in Scientific American magazine. In 1981, Gardner's column alternated with a new column by Hofstadter called "Metamagical Themas" (an anagram of "Mathematical Games"). Then Hofstadter's column appeared monthly from January 1982 through July 1983.

French edition
Metamagical Themas was also published in French, under the title Ma Thémagie (InterEditions, 1988), the translators being Jean-Baptiste Berthelin, Jean-Luc Bonnetain, and Lise Rosenbaum.

The wordplay was lost in the French title, and replaced with another one (ma Thémagie would translate to "my themagy", where "themagy" is a neologism, but could also be read as maths et magie, which translates to "maths and magic"). The translators had contemplated Le matin des métamagiciens, which would have been a play on Hofstadter's title plus Le Matin des Magiciens and Jeux malins des mathématiciens (respectively, The Dawn of the Magicians and Clever Tricks of Mathematicians); however, the publisher found that suggestion to be too elaborate.

Reception
Dave Langford reviewed Metamagical Themas for White Dwarf #88, and stated that "a heady mixture of computers, art, mathematics, philosophy, jokes and above all games."

References

External links
 
 "A Person Paper on Purity in Language", one of the included essays, first published in September 1983

1985 books
Basic Books books
Books by Douglas Hofstadter
Cognitive science literature
Philosophy books
Works originally published in American magazines